"Four Seasons" is a song recorded by South Korean singer Taeyeon. Written by Kenzie, whom also co-produced the song with Afshin Salmani, Andrew Allen and Josh Cumbee, the reggae-tinged ballad was released as a digital single on March 24, 2019, by SM Entertainment and Dreamus, with an accompanying music video released two days prior to its digital release. Initially a standalone single, both the song and the B-side track "Blue" were later included as bonus tracks in the Korean release of Taeyeon's second album Purpose, released on October 28.

Upon its release, "Four Seasons" received positive reviews from music critics for solidifying the singer's growth as a "full-time" vocalist. The song achieved great commercial success, earning Taeyeon her fifth chart-topper as a lead artist (sixth overall) on the Gaon Digital Chart for two weeks and to date, her longest charting performance on the chart. It eventually became her first single to receive a Platinum certificate by KMCA for achieving over 100,000,000 streaming units in November 2019, only six months after its release. The singer eventually promoted both songs during her concert "’s…one" on March 28. It won the Digital Daesang award at the 29th Seoul Music Awards in January 2020.

Background and release 
On March 17, 2019, Taeyeon was announced to be releasing a digital single titled "Four Seasons" with its b-side track "Blue". The song is described as a ballad with an instrumental structure that is centered on acoustic guitars. It compares the ups and downs of love to the four seasons. While the B-side track "Blue" is a ballad song with Taeyeon's affectionate vocals and lyrics that capture the double meaning of 'blue' (푸른) and 'gloomy/feeling blue' (우울한) and the longing for an old lover and feelings after a break-up. The music video for "Four Seasons" was released on March 22, two day before the single album. Taeyeon later filmed a live performance of the song from her concert "’s…one", which was released on March 28.

Chart performance 
"Four Seasons" debuted at number one on South Korea's Gaon Digital Chart for the chart issue dated March 24–30, 2019. It was the best-performing single of March 2019 on the Gaon Digital Chart. It claimed the number one spot on the Billboard K-Pop Hot 100 for two consecutive weeks and reached number 6 on the Billboard World Digital Songs chart.

Accolades

Track listing

Charts

Weekly charts

Monthly charts

Year-end charts

Certifications and sales

Personnel 
Credits are adapted from the CD booklet of Purpose.

 Original title: "Did You Ever Even Love Me At All"
 Korean lyrics by Kenzie
 Composed by Josh Cumbee (Nonfiction), Afshin Salmani (Nonfiction), Andrew Allen, Kenzie
 Arranged by Kenzie, Nonfiction (Josh Cumbee & Afshin Salmani (AFSHeeN))
 Vocal directed by Kenzie
 Background vocals by Taeyeon
 Bass Performed by Choi Hoon (78)
 Guitar Performed by Hong Jun-ho
 Strings Arranged & Conducted by Ina Il
 Strings Performed by ON the string
 Recorded by Lee Min-gyu at SM Big Shot Studio/ Jeong Ki-hong (Assistant. Choi Da-in) at Seoul Studio/ Lee Chang-sun at prelude Studio
 Digital Editing by Jang Woo-young at doobdoob Studio
 Engineered for Mix by Lee Min-gyu at SM Big Shot Studio
 Mixed by Gu Jong-pil (BeatBurger) at SM Yellow Tail Studio
 Mastered by Kwon Nam-woo at 821 Sound Mastering

Release history

See also
 List of Inkigayo Chart winners (2019)
 List of Show! Music Core Chart winners (2019)
 List of Gaon Digital Chart number ones of 2019
 List of K-pop Hot 100 number ones
 List of certified songs in South Korea

References

External links 
 

2019 singles
2019 songs
SM Entertainment singles
Korean-language songs
Songs written by Kenzie (songwriter)
Taeyeon songs
Reggae songs
Songs written by Josh Cumbee
Gaon Digital Chart number-one singles
Billboard Korea K-Pop number-one singles